is a residential area of Tokyo located in Suginami ward (one of the 23 wards or boroughs of Tokyo) west of Shinjuku. Main access to Asagaya is via the Chūō-Sōbu Line, 12 minutes by train from Shinjuku station.

Geography
At present the Asagaya area is divided latitudinally into North  and South  by the Chūō-Sōbu Line. Longitudinally, the Japanese Zelkova serrata tree-lined boulevard, divides Asagaya, running from Ome-kaido in the south to Waseda-dōri in the north. From around the Taishō period people began moving from the Yamanote area (central Tokyo) into the suburbs including Asagaya. At present, the area around the station is considered upper-level Tokyo suburban housing due to its space, greenery, convenience to central Tokyo—and numerous Shōtengai, the largest of which originates from the South exit of Asagaya Station.

Asagaya is accessible by train, subway, and bus. The ward office is located directly above the Minami-Asagaya station.

Transportation 
 JR East Asagaya Station (Chūō-Sōbu Line) 
 Tokyo Metro Minami-Asagaya Station (Tokyo Metro Marunouchi Line)

History
The origin of the area name "Asagaya" comes from the combination of two words, the adjective "asai" meaning "shallow" and the geographical noun  meaning "marsh" or low wetlands. In 1921 a stop was created on the Sōbū streetcar line running on Ome-kaido from Shinjuku to Ogikubo, which later became the  streetcar line, then the present subway Marunouchi line. Service on the Tōden Suginami streetcar ended in 1961. Asagaya Station was built and added to the Kōbu railway line (built 1884;  in 1924, which later became the Chūō Main Line.

After the exodus from central Tokyo following the Kantō Earthquake of 1923, Asagaya became the home to a literature community beginning with Ibuse Masuji, and eventually including Yosano Akiko, Dazai Osamu, Aoyagi Mizuho, Ima Harube, Miyoshi Tatsuji, Hino Ashihei, and Tokugawa Musei. Because of this history Asagaya is also known as "Literary Town Asagaya".

Entertainment

Theater, film, and music
Asagaya is home to three theater spaces, Hitsuji-za, Theater Shine, and Zamuza, located about the revival movie house Laputa, which specializes in 1950–1970s Japanese film. It is also home to the anime studio A-1 Pictures.

Along the bar streets that run to the west of the JR Asagaya Station on the north and south sides are a number of tiny music venues, mostly jazz and folk oriented. A number of bars that offer jazz, blues, and rock also pepper the western bar area.

Shopping
The covered shopping street (shōtengai) Pearl Center, located on the south side of JR Asagaya station, is the largest in the area, though, smaller uncovered shōtengai also run to the north of the station. While Koenji to the east is known for its used clothing stores, most of the goods available are oriented toward household needs, though on the north side a number of used book and manga stores also do business.

Eating and drinking
On the lively street,  originating from the northeast side of the JR Asagaya station, there are a number of tiny, intimate eateries, however while some places are renowned for their food, the size and number of these dens makes for an adventure.

Festivals
Asagaya has two large festivals each year. The  is held annually during the first week of August.  The Tanabata festival is known for its assortment of hanging papier-mâché characters that adorn the Pearl Road.

Asagaya is also known for its jazz festival, Asagaya Jazz Streets, held over the last weekend in October. This jazz festival is one of the largest in the city with musicians playing an assortment of venues.

In popular culture
Asagaya appears in the films Ring, Ring 2, Death Note, New Game! and Yellow Tears. It is also the setting for the long-running manga series Dokudami Tenement by Takashi Fukutani, and its film and anime adaptations.

References

External links
 Asagaya Jazz Streets (Japanese)
 Asagaya Navigator (Japanese)

Suginami
Neighborhoods of Tokyo